Oksana Knizhnik (born 3 January 1977) is a Ukrainian gymnast. She competed in five events at the 1996 Summer Olympics.

See also
List of Olympic female artistic gymnasts for Ukraine

References

1977 births
Living people
Ukrainian female artistic gymnasts
Olympic gymnasts of Ukraine
Gymnasts at the 1996 Summer Olympics
Gymnasts from Kyiv